Daniel Rappaport is an American producer.

He is a founding partner, with Guymon Casady, of leading talent management firm Management 360.

Filmography

References

External links

Living people
1970 births
American television producers
American film producers